Pissing on the Legacy is a remix album by SMP, released in October 2008 by Music Ration Entertainment.

Track listing

Personnel
Adapted from the Pissing on the Legacy liner notes.

SMP
 Jason Bazinet – lead vocals, drums, programming

Additional performers
 Wade Alin – guitar, additional programming
 Dee Madden – additional vocals (2, 7)
 Chris Roy – guitar
 Mike Welch – guitar

Release history

References

External links 
 Pissing on the Legacy at Discogs (list of releases)

2008 remix albums
SMP (band) albums